Bolitoglossa platydactyla, commonly known as the broadfoot mushroomtongue salamander and broad-footed salamander, is a species of salamander in the family Plethodontidae.
It is endemic to Mexico.

Its natural habitats are subtropical or tropical moist lowland forests, moist savanna, plantations, rural gardens, and urban areas.
It is threatened by habitat loss.

References

platydactyla
Endemic amphibians of Mexico
Taxonomy articles created by Polbot
Amphibians described in 1831